Gunnar Andersson may refer to:

 Gunnar Andersson (footballer) (1928–1969), Swedish footballer
 Gunnar Andersson (trade unionist) (1890–1946), Swedish trade unionist
 Gunnar Andersson (politician) (1896–1956), Finnish politician
 Johan Gunnar Andersson (1874–1960), Swedish geologist and archaeologist